Tardebigge Lake is a large feeder reservoir, about  in size, built to supply water for the famous flight of locks running from Tardebigge towards Worcester, on the Worcester and Birmingham Canal. It is maintained by the Canal and River Trust and still supplies water to the canal system.

Access to walkers is allowed to the dam end and the side of the lake alongside the canal path.

Fishing
The lake was used for many years as a general fishery run by Cadbury's of Bournville, then licensed by British Waterways. It is now run as a closed syndicate and, as it increases in popularity, spaces for the syndicate are limited.

References

External links
 Tardebigge Anglers

Worcester and Birmingham Canal
Canal reservoirs in England
Reservoirs in Worcestershire